The 1976 Wayne State Tartars football team represented Wayne State University as a member of the Great Lakes Intercollegiate Athletic Conference (GLIAC) during the 1976 NCAA Division II football season. In their third year under head coach Dick Lowry, the Tartars compiled an 8–2 record (3–2 against GLIAC opponents) and finished in a tie for second place in the conference.

Schedule

References

Wayne State
Wayne State Warriors football seasons
Wayne State Tartars football